is a Japanese footballer currently playing as a defender for Tegevajaro Miyazaki from 2023.

Career
On 21 December 2022, Manabe joined to J3 club, Tegevajaro Miyazaki for upcoming 2023 season.

Career statistics

Club
.

Notes

References

External links

1997 births
Living people
Japanese footballers
Association football defenders
Toin University of Yokohama alumni
J2 League players
J3 League players
Renofa Yamaguchi FC players
Tegevajaro Miyazaki players